The 2012–13 Texas Southern Tigers basketball team represented Texas Southern University during the 2012–13 NCAA Division I men's basketball season. The Tigers, led by first year head coach Mike Davis, played their home games at the Health and Physical Education Arena and were members of the Southwestern Athletic Conference. Texas Southern is serving a two-year postseason ban for men's basketball, after the NCAA Division I Infractions Committee said it found a lack of institutional control and outlined problems spanning 13 sports over a seven-year period, including booster-related recruiting violations, academic improprieties, the use of ineligible athletes and exceeding scholarship limits. The Tigers finished the season 17–14, 16–2 in SWAC play to claim the SWAC regular season championship. They ended the season on a 12-game winning streak. Due to the post season ban, they could not participate in the 2013 SWAC men's basketball tournament.

Roster

Schedule

|-
!colspan=9| Regular Season

References

Texas Southern Tigers basketball seasons
Texas Southern
Texas Southern Tigers basketball
Texas Southern Tigers basketball